La Quotidiana is the only Romansh daily newspaper. It is published by the Südostschweiz Mediengruppe and was founded in 1997 with support from the Romansh news agency Agentura da Novitads Rumantscha. The newspaper is based in Ilanz, previously in Chur. It is the successor of all Romansh newspapers, with the exception of the Surmiran Pagina da Surmeir. La Quotidiana is written in both the traditional varieties and the standardized language Rumantsch Grischun; often more than half of the articles are written in Sursilvan, the variety with the largest number of speakers.

See also
 (Book about history of the Romansh language)

References

External links 
 Newspaper website (in Romansh)
 

1997 establishments in Switzerland
Mass media in Chur
Newspapers published in Switzerland
Newspapers established in 1997
Romansh language